The Larchmont Chronicle is a monthly community newspaper serving Larchmont Village, Hancock Park, Windsor Square, Fremont Place, Park La Brea and Miracle Mile in Los Angeles, California, United States. It is independently owned.

History

In 1963, two young women canvassed the Larchmont area in Los Angeles to start a community newspaper. The first issue of the Larchmont Chronicle was mailed to 10,000 families in the upper income areas of Hancock Park and Windsor Square. The women, Dawne Goodwin and Jane Gilman, secured 28 advertisers for the first 12-page issue. They each earned $250 on the first issue, and the paper has been in the black ever since. Dawne Goodwin retired in 1997, moved to Fallbrook, California, and died on October 14, 2012. The Chronicle later expanded its coverage and is now hand-delivered in a plastic bag to 21,000 households.  On May 1, 2015, Gilman sold the paper to attorney and neighborhood resident John Welborne; Gilman remains a contributing editor.

Awards

The Larchmont Chronicle has been commended by many organizations for its support and promotion of their objectives. Non-profit agencies who have given awards include the American Red Cross, Wilshire Chamber of Commerce, Wilshire Community Police Council, the Los Angeles Conservancy, Windsor Square-Hancock Park Historical Society, City Councilman Tom LaBonge and the Miracle Mile Civic Coalition.

Coverage

Hancock Park, Windsor Square, Fremont Place, Larchmont Village, Brookside, Windsor Village, Miracle Mile, Park La Brea, the Palazzo East and West and the Villas. It has an estimated readership of 76,439.

Pricing

The Larchmont Chronicle is a free newspaper to the community it serves, but a yearly donation of $25 may be paid.

References

External links

Monthly newspapers
Newspapers published in Greater Los Angeles
Newspapers established in 1963
1963 establishments in California